Goody Bag is the second and final EP album by the South Korean duo Kim Heechul & Kim Jungmo, released by Label SJ, SM Entertainment and distributed KT Music on July 12, 2016.

Background and release 
On July 6, 2016 Kim Heechul & Kim Jungmo announced to be releasing their second EP album titled Goody Bag on July 12. The lead track, "Ulsanbawi" is traditional trot genre. The album contains six tracks, all written by Heechul and composed by Jungmo. This time, they also changed their group name to Kim Heechul & Kim Jungmo.

Promotion 
Kim Heechul & Kim Jungmo began performing "Ulsanbawi" on South Korean music television programs (The Show) on July 19, 2016.

Track listing

Charts

Album charts and sales

Single

Release history

References

External links
 
 

SM Entertainment EPs
Korean-language EPs
2016 EPs
SM Entertainment albums
Kim Heechul & Kim Jungmo EPs